Paul P. Walther (March 23, 1927 – December 21, 2014) was an American basketball player.

Life
Walther was a native of Covington, Kentucky and a graduate of Covington Catholic High School.  He was a 6'2" guard/forward at the University of Tennessee, where he was coached by Emmett Lowery. His playing career was split by World War II, when he served in the United States Navy. He was team captain at Tennessee during 1948–49, his final season there.

Walther played six seasons (1949–1955) in the National Basketball Association as a member of the Minneapolis Lakers, Indianapolis Olympians, Philadelphia Warriors, and Fort Wayne Pistons.  He averaged 7.7 points per game in his career and appeared in the 1952 NBA All-Star Game.

After his basketball career, Walther worked 32 years for Merrill Lynch in Chicago.

Walther died in Atlanta at the age of 87.

NBA career statistics

Regular season

Playoffs

References

1927 births
2014 deaths
American men's basketball players
Fort Wayne Pistons players
Indianapolis Olympians players
Merrill (company) people
Minneapolis Lakers draft picks
Minneapolis Lakers players
National Basketball Association All-Stars
Philadelphia Warriors players
Tennessee Volunteers basketball players
Undrafted National Basketball Association players
Covington Catholic High School alumni
Small forwards
Guards (basketball)
United States Navy personnel of World War II